Barker may refer to:

Occupations
 Barker (occupation), a person who attempts to attract patrons to entertainment events
 Barker (coachbuilder), a builder of horse-drawn coaches and later of bodywork for prestige cars
 a person who strips tanbark from trees to supply bark mills

People
Barker (surname), a list of people
Barker Burnell (1798–1843), U.S. Representative from Massachusetts
Barker Fairley (1887–1986), British-Canadian painter and scholar of German literature

Places

Antarctica
Barker Range, Victoria Land, a mountain range
Barker Peak, off the coast of Victoria Land
Barker Bank, Graham Land, a marine bank
Barker Nunatak, Palmer Land

Australia
Division of Barker, an Electoral Division in South Australia for the Australian House of Representatives
Mount Barker (South Australia)
Barker Inlet, South Australia
Barker River, Western Australia
Barker Passage, Western Australia, a water channel

United States
Barker, Broome County, New York, a town
Barker, Niagara County, New York, a village
Barker, Texas, an unincorporated community
Barker, West Virginia, an unincorporated community
Barker Reservoir, near Houston, Texas

Elsewhere
Barker, Uruguay, a town
7868 Barker, an asteroid

Man-made structures
Barker Field, several former airfields in Toronto, Canada
Barker Building, Omaha, Nebraska, on the U.S. National Register of Historic Places
Barker General Store, Beecher Hollow, New York, on the U.S. National Register of Historic Places
Barker Mill, Auburn, Maine, on the U.S. National Register of Historic Places
Barker Dam (California), on the U.S. National Register of Historic Places
Barker Dam at Barker Meadow Reservoir, Colorado, United States
Barker Ranch, last hideout of Charles Manson and his "family"
Barker railway station, Melbourne, Australia

Other uses
Barker baronets, five baronetcies, all extinct
Barker channel, a television channel with programming comprising mainly advertising
Barker College, a private college in Sydney, Australia
Barker's Discount Department Stores, a retail chain in the United States and the Caribbean
Barkers of Kensington, a London department store
Dog, a domesticated animal whose vocalizations include barking
, a destroyer which served in World War II
The Barker, a 1928 film
The Barkers, Australian musical group

See also
Barkers, New Zealand menswear retail chain
Barkers Creek, West Virginia, United States
Mount Barker (disambiguation)